Vanich Chaiyawan (born 1931) is a Thai billionaire businessman, chairman of Thai Life Insurance, the second-largest life insurer in Thailand.

Early life
Vanich Chaiyawan was born in 1931. He comes from a Thai Chinese family.

Career
Chaiyawan owns about 60% of Thai Life, which is now run by his son Chai Chaiyawan as president. He also owns Thai Asia Pacific Brewery and Thai Credit Retail Bank.

Personal life
He is married with eight children and lives in Bangkok.

References 

1931 births
Living people
Vanich Chaiyawan
Vanich Chaiyawan